Bhagwati Charan Verma (30 August 1903 – 5 October 1981) was a Hindi author. He wrote many novels, his best work was Chitralekha (1934), which was made into two successful Hindi films in 1941 and 1964 respectively. He was awarded Sahitya Akademi Award for his epic five-part novel, Bhoole Bisre Chitra in 1961 and Padma Bhushan in 1971. He was also nominated to Rajya Sabha in 1978.

Early life and education 
Verma Sahab was born on 30 August 1903 in a  Kayastha family in Tahsil Safipur, in present-day Uttar Pradesh, India, where he received his early education. His father, Shri Devi Charan Ji used to advocate in Kanpur. Balak Bhagwati's early education was in Safipur. Bhagwati Babu was sent to Prayag University for higher education from where he received a bachelor's degree in literature and law.  He also spent some years living with his extended family at the ancestral home in Patkapur. Thereafter he studied in The Sophical School, and went on to do his B.A. L.L.B. from Allahabad University.

Career 

He also served as a Hindi advisor at All India Radio, Lucknow and later in 1978, he was nominated to the Upper House of Indian Parliament, Rajya Sabha. He died on 5 October 1981. A park is named after him, in his birthplace, the town of Safipur

Writings 

 Bhule Bisre Chitra, Rajkamal Prakashan, Delhi, 1959.
 Chitralekha
 Yuvraj Choonda
 Sabahin Nachawat Ram Gosain
 Kahi na Jay ka Kahiye
 Rekha
 Samarthya Aur Seema
 Sampooran Natak
 Sidhi Sachchi Baten
 Tedhey Medhey Rastey
 Woh Phir Nahi Aai
 Do Banke
 Mathrubhu Barbar Santh Pranam
 Diwano ki Hasti
 Chanakya 
He also wrote other numerous short stories which were not published but still was recognised by other writers

Further reading 
 Bhagwati Charan Verma, by Srilal Shukla, Translator, Tripti Jain, New Delhi, Sahitya Akademi. 1994. .

TV serial 

 Teen Varsh (TV Serial, Telecast in 1993 on Doordarshan Lucknow and in 1995 on Doordarshan National Network)- Cast : Shekhar Suman, Gauri Saigan, Jaya Bhattacharya, Dinesh Shakul, Director – Sunil Batta
 Jeevan Ek Rang Anek (TV Series, 2003 Doordarshan Lucknow) : Director  Sunil Batta
 Jeevan Ke Rang (TV Series, 2005 DD Bharti) : Director – Sunil Batta

References

Bibliography

External links 
 Bhagwati Charan Verma at Kavita Kosh  (Hindi)
 Bhagwati Charan Verma at Online Unna

1903 births
1981 deaths
Hindi-language writers
University of Allahabad alumni
People from Unnao
Recipients of the Sahitya Akademi Award in Hindi
Recipients of the Padma Bhushan in literature & education
Nominated members of the Rajya Sabha
Indian male novelists
Indian male short story writers
20th-century Indian novelists
20th-century Indian short story writers
Novelists from Uttar Pradesh
20th-century Indian male writers